Samborz may refer to the following places in Poland:
Samborz, Lower Silesian Voivodeship
Samborz, West Pomeranian Voivodeship
Sambórz, Łódź Voivodeship
Sambórz, Masovian Voivodeship